Scolytus is a genus of bark beetles (subfamily Scolytinae). It includes several species notorious for destroying trees in the forests. The Dutch elm disease is spread in North America by two species : the native elm bark beetle, Hylurgopinus rufipes, and the European elm bark beetle, Scolytus multistriatus. In Europe, while the aforementioned Scolytus multistriatus again acts as vector for infection, it is much less effective than the large elm bark beetle Scolytus scolytus.

Species
Species include:
Scolytus amygdali Guerin, 1847, the almond bark beetle
Scolytus dentatus Bright, 1964
Scolytus fagi Walsh, 1867
Scolytus jacobsoni Spessivtzev, 1919
Scolytus laricis Blackman, 1934, the larch engraver
Scolytus mali (Bechstein, 1805), the larger shothole borer
Scolytus monticolae Swaine, 1917
Scolytus multistriatus (Marsham, 1802), the European elm bark beetle, smaller European elm bark beetle
Scolytus muticus Say, 1824, the hackberry beetle
Scolytus obelus Wood, 1962
Scolytus opacus Blackman, 1934
Scolytus oregoni Blackman, 1934
Scolytus praeceps Le Conte, 1876
Scolytus quadrispinosus Say, 1824, the hickory bark beetle
Scolytus reflexus Blackman, 1934
Scolytus robustus Blackman, 1934
Scolytus rugulosus (Müller, 1818), the shothole borer
Scolytus schevyrewi Semenov, 1902, the banded elm bark beetle
Scolytus scolytus (Fabricius, 1775), larger European elm bark beetle
Scolytus subscaber Le Conte, 1876
Scolytus unispinosus Le Conte, 1876, the Douglas-fir engraver
Scolytus ventralis Le Conte, 1868, the fir engraver

References

External links 

PaDIL Sheet on Scolytus scolytus

Scolytinae
Insect pests of temperate forests
Curculionidae genera